Wimmeria chiapensis is a species of plant in the family Celastraceae. It is endemic to Chiapas state in southern Mexico.

References

chiapensis
Endemic flora of Mexico
Trees of Chiapas
Endangered plants
Endangered biota of Mexico
Taxonomy articles created by Polbot
Plants described in 1968
Cloud forest flora of Mexico